Desulfovibrio burkinensis  is a Gram-negative, non-spore-forming and sulfate-reducing bacterium from the genus of Desulfovibrio which has been isolated from soil from a ricefield in Burkina Faso in Africa.

References

External links
Type strain of Desulfovibrio burkinensis at BacDive -  the Bacterial Diversity Metadatabase	

Bacteria described in 1999
Desulfovibrio